Sadar Hills is a geographic area in the state of Manipur in North East India.

People
Sadar Hills is inhabited by heterogeneous ethnic groups with inherent socio-economic and cultural backgrounds, including the indigenous Kukis, the Nepalis and Nagas. Many of the people are economically underprivileged. As per the Hill House Counting and Grazing Tax assessment of 2012, the total number of villages and population of Sadar Hills in the three sub-divisional wise are shown below:

Geography
Sadar Hills has mild climatic conditions. The land has a complete and clear demarcated boundary.

Government
In 1971, during the process for granting full-fledged statehood to Manipur, the government of India passed an Act of Parliament, called Manipur (Hill Areas) Autonomous District Council Act, 1971 (vide Section 4 of Sub-Section 3, Bill No. 76 of 26/12/1971) for safeguarding the hill areas and protection of the tribals in Manipur. The Act provides for creation of six Autonomous District Councils in the hill areas of Manipur for ultimate conversion into full-fledged district, viz.:

 Manipur North Autonomous District (Senapati)
 Sadar Hills Autonomous District (Sadar Hills)
 Manipur East Autonomous District (Ukhrul)
 Tengnoupal Autonomous District (Chandel)
 Manipur South Autonomous District (Churachandpur)
 Manipur West Autonomous District (Tamenglong)

In spite of many protests by the Naga people of the area, as of 2016 Sadar Hills had been created as a district.

See also

 North Eastern Council
 Hill tribes of Northeast India

References 

Geography of Manipur